Degueyo (also known as De Guello, Deguejo and Deguello) is a 1966 Italian Spaghetti Western film directed by Giuseppe Vari.

Plot 

Norman returns to Danger City seeking revenge for the death of his father. The bandit Ramon and his men are responsible. But in the town there are only women. Ramon in fact has killed most of the men and kidnapped the others: he hopes to obtain the necessary information to find a treasure hidden by an ex confederate officer.

Cast 

 Giacomo Rossi-Stuart: Norman Sandel 
 Dan Vadis: Ramon 
 Rosy Zichel: Rosy 
 Dana Ghia: Jenny Slader 
 Riccardo Garrone: Foran
 José Torres: Logan 
 Giuseppe Addobbati: Colonel Clark  
 Daniele Vargas: Frank  
 Erika Blanc: Woman of Danger City 
 Aurora Bautista: Woman of Danger City   
 Silvana Jachino

References

Citations

External links
 

1966 films
Italian Western (genre) films
Spaghetti Western films
1966 Western (genre) films
Films directed by Giuseppe Vari
1960s Italian films